Megerlia is a genus of brachiopods belonging to the family Kraussinidae.

The species of this genus are found in Europe and Africa.

Species:

Megerlia acrura 
Megerlia granosa 
Megerlia truncata 
Megerlia willemoesi

References

Terebratulida
Brachiopod genera